("Bauhöfer Family Brewery) is a brewery company in Renchen-Ulm, Baden-Württemberg, Germany, established in 1852.

Beers 

The company produces a range of beers, some seasonal, including (with ABV)

  (2.5)
  (2.7)
  (5.4)
  (5.1)
  (5.1)
  (4.8)
  (5.3)
  (5.1)
  (7.2)
  (?)
  (9.9)
  (5.9)
  (5.2)
  (2.7)
  (?)
  (5.2)
  (7.4)

References

External links 

 

Breweries in Germany
Beer in Germany
Companies based in Baden-Württemberg
German companies established in 1852